Siarka Tarnobrzeg is a Polish professional football club, based in Tarnobrzeg, Subcarpathian Voivodeship, which competes in II liga in the 2022–23 season, the third tier of the national football league system. In early 1990s, Siarka played in the Ekstraklasa, with such players as Cezary Kucharski, Andrzej Kobylański, Tomasz Kiełbowicz and Mariusz Kukiełka.

Honours
 11th spot in the Ekstraklasa: 1993
 Runner Up of the U-19 Polish Championships: 1979
 Bronze Medal in the U-19 Polish Championship: 1999

Supporters and rivalries 
The great character species have games between Siarka Tarnobrzeg and Stal Stalowa Wola; called the great derby of Subcarpathia (wielkie derby Podkarpacia).

References

External links
 Siarka Tarnobrzeg at the 90minut.pl

Association football clubs established in 1957
1957 establishments in Poland
Tarnobrzeg
Football clubs in Podkarpackie Voivodeship